An Arrephoros was a girl acolyte in the cult of Athena Polias on the Athenian Acropolis. They were seven to eleven years old. According to Pausanias, two Arrephoroi lived for a year on the Acropolis and concluded their term with a mystery rite called the Arrhephoria: they carried unknown objects into a cavern, and there exchanged them for other unknown objects.

The lexicon of Harpocration states (s.v. Arrêphorein) that there were four Arrephoroi and that two supervised the weaving of the Panathenaic peplos.

Notes

Sources
 Joan Breton Connelly, Portrait of a priestess: Women and Ritual in Ancient Greece, p. 27  

Ancient Athenian religious titles
Athena
Ancient Greek priestesses
Obsolete occupations